Keçikalesi is a belde (town) in Niğde Province, Turkey

It was declared a seat of township in 1989. Its population as of 2016 was 1959

References

Populated places in Niğde Province
Altunhisar District
1989 establishments in Turkey